Martin Dunne may refer to:

 Martin Dunne (footballer, born 1886) (1886–1955), played for Southampton
 Martin Dunne (Gaelic footballer), Cavan inter-county player
 Martin Dunne (Lord Lieutenant) (born 1938), British public servant

See also
Martin Dunn (disambiguation)